The National Roads and Motorways in Greece constitute the main road network of the country. These two types of roads are distinct in terms of their construction specifications. Their main difference is that motorways (Greek: Αυτοκινητόδρομοι) adhere to higher quality construction standards than National Roads (Greek: Εθνικές Οδοί).

For example, a typical motorway (highway) in Greece consists of six or four lanes (three or two lanes in each direction) plus an emergency lane, separated by a central barrier. Entrances and exits to the motorways are only provided at grade-separated junctions (interchanges) and there are no traffic lights. Greek motorways are generally organized so that the odd-numbered motorways are of north-south alignment and the even-numbered motorways are of east-west alignment. However, there are many exceptions.

A typical National Road in Greece is usually a single carriageway or limited-access road with at-grade intersections and with one or two traffic lanes for each direction, usually with an emergency lane on each side as well. The designation of some important roads of Greece as "national" was first decided by a 1955 decree, while a minister's decision in 1963 determined the numbering of these roads. In 1998, a survey of the Hellenic Statistical Authority defined some new national roads that were constructed after the 1963 decision.

The naming system of motorways and National Roads is different. For example, "A2" refers to the Egnatia Odos motorway, while "GR-2" refers to National Road 2. All motorways are named by using the capital letter "A", followed by a number (e.g. A1). The main motorways of Greece have a single digit number and auxiliary motorways perpendicular to the main ones have a double digit number (e.g. A25). Motorways have their own white-on-green signs, while National Roads are designated by white-on-blue signs.

The construction of the Greek motorway network has been, to a large extent, a very complex and demanding project due to the peculiarities of the geomorphology of the areas through which the new roads pass. The Greek mainland is extremely mountainous; the local topography as well as environmental concerns regarding the local flora and fauna played a decisive role in the final route design. In order to overcome these difficulties, the construction of multiple large and expensive technical works, such as tunnels and bridges, was necessary in many cases. Indicatively, the total number of tunnels built along the four Greek major highways (A1, A2, A5, A8) is about 150 and their total length is about 200 km (measured as a single bore).

With a total length of about 2320 km as of 2020, Greece's motorway network is the biggest one in Southeastern Europe and one of the most advanced in Europe.

Motorways

Greece's motorway network has been extensively modernized throughout the 2000s and part of it is still under construction. Most of it was completed by early 2017. There are a total of 10 main routes throughout the Greek mainland and Crete, from which some feature numerous branches/auxiliary routes, as described in the listing below.

Greek motorways according to ministerial decree of 2015

A1 (Athens - Thessaloniki - Evzonoi)

Motorway 1 is the oldest and most important motorway of Greece, connecting the country's largest cities, Athens and Thessaloniki and passing through many important regions of Greece on a south-north direction. Section Chalastra - Evzonoi was constructed earlier as an expressway, with no upgrade planned.

The full length of this motorway is around 553 km or 346 miles, including 14 km or 8.7 miles of shared route with the A2 (Egnatia Odos).  Note that until recently, the "P" in "PAThE" referred to Patras, but the Patra – Athens section has now become part of the A8 (Olympia Odos) motorway, belonging to a different project.

 Motorway 11 is a branch of the Motorway 1, connecting it with the city of Chalcis.
 Motorway 12 is a planned branch of the Motorway 1, connecting it with the city of Volos. Upgrade of the pre-existing section is under way.
 Motorway 13 is a planned branch of the Motorway, from Thiva to Elefsina; connecting it with the Olympia Odos motorway and serving as a western bypass of Athens Metropolitan Area.

A2 (Egnatia Odos)

Motorway 2, officially named Egnatia Odos (Egnatia Motorway), is a motorway situated in northern Greece, connecting several major cities on the way. It starts at the port of Igoumenitsa and ends at Kipoi border crossing with Turkey.

Part of its length, a section of about 360 km (220 mi) from Evros to Thessaloniki, parallels the ancient Roman Via Egnatia, which ran from modern Durrës in Albania to Thessaloniki and thence to Byzantium (now Istanbul, Turkey). The project has therefore been dubbed a modern Via Egnatia (in Greek, Egnatia Odos / Εγνατία Οδός). However, the parallel is not exact; the original Via Egnatia was much longer (1,120 km / 696 miles) and its western section, from Thessaloniki to the Adriatic Sea, ran much further north than the modern road.

Specifically, there are auxiliary routes to Albania and Bulgaria, with the main route leading to Turkey. North Macedonia is accessed through the A1 (PAThE), as described above, or via Motorway A27 (see below).  Another auxiliary route runs close to the Evros river in the prefecture of the same name, reaching a point where Greece's, Turkey's and Bulgaria's borders meet. Some of those auxiliary routes are not yet motorways, but typical 2-lane expressways, although they are of considerably higher quality than other similar expressways in the rest of Greece. The project (including most of the auxiliary routes), was completed in 2009, with the length of the main route being 670 kilometers or 416 miles, making it the longest motorway in Greece.

 Motorway 24 is a branch of the A2 (Egnatia Odos), referred to as the Thessaloniki – Nea Moudania Motorway or Chalkidiki Motorway, connecting Thessaloniki to Nea Moudania on the Chalkidiki peninsula. As it passes through the eastern periphery of Thessaloniki the A24 becomes part of the Thessaloniki Inner Ring Road (Esoteriki Peripheriaki Odos).
 Motorway 25 is a branch of the A2 (Egnatia Odos) and lies between Thessaloniki to the Greek–Bulgarian border crossing, via Serres (taking over parts of the GR-12).
 Motorway 27 is another branch of the A2 (Egnatia Odos), at Kozani which leads towards Ptolemaida and from there to Florina and the border crossing with North Macedonia at Niki. Within 2012 tenders were announced for the construction of the 14 kilometers section from Florina up to the border crossing with North Macedonia. Construction of this section started in 2013, finished in 2015 and it was opened to traffic on 20 May 2016. The Ptolemaida - Florina part is currently an expressway, planned to be upgraded to a motorway.
 Motorway 29 is a branch of the A2 (Egnatia Odos) motorway, connecting it with the city of Kastoria and the Greek–Albanian border crossing at Krystallopigi.

A3 (Central Greece Motorway) 
Motorway 3, or the Central Greece Motorway (usually referred to as just E65) is currently under construction. It will lead from Motorway 1 near Lamia to Motorway 2 near Grevena and will carry the European route E65. Its total length will be .

Construction began in 2009, lasted 2 years and stopped in 2011 due to the financial crisis. At the end of 2013 it was decided to proceed with the immediate construction of the central middle section, Trikala - Xyniada with a length of 80 km, while construction of the northern (Grevena-Trikala) and southern (Xyniada-Lamia) sections was postponed.

The middle section between Xyniada and Trikala was inaugurated and opened to traffic on December 22, 2017. In October 2018 the European Commission approved the funding for the construction of the southern section, Xyniada - Lamia, which out of the 32,5km, the 14,2 km section from Motorway 1 to Karpenissi I/C is opened to traffic on July 15th, 2021, while the rest is underway and is expected to be completed until 2023. The construction of the northern section, Trikala - Egnatia Odos junction, has started on November of 2021.

A5 (Ionia Odos)
Motorway 5, also referred to as the Ionia Odos (Ionian Motorway), is a fully operational motorway since 3 August 2017 when its last section under construction was delivered to traffic. It starts from Ioannina at the A2 (Egnatia Odos) interchange, and currently ends at Rio, in Patras, after crossing the Corinthian Gulf through the Rio-Antirrio bridge. There, it connects to the A8 motorway (see below).

The route passes through most of western continental Greece, along the Ionian Sea, hence its name "Ionia Odos". Work on the majority of the highway began in spring 2006 and would span six years, to be completed by 2012. Though, because of economic problems of the constructing companies, all construction works were halted in 2011, but since mid-2013 works on the whole of the 196 km motorway started again. The motorway was completed in August 2017.
 Motorway 52, also known as Ambrakia Odos (Amvrakia Motorway) is a branch of the A5 (Ionia Odos) connecting it with the island of Lefkada and the undersea-tunnel of Aktio, leading to Preveza. This motorway section is expected to serve the popular tourist region around the Ambracian Gulf. Earthworks were largely completed by April 2012 but structures had not commenced as of that time. In mid-2013, works had begun again, but as of December 2016, problems with funding have kept the road largely behind schedule. The  section from the Preveza - Aktio tunnel to Vonitsa and the  section from Ionia Odos to Loutraki (also known as Amfilochia bypass), have been opened to traffic in 2019 and 2022 respectively. The  section from Loutraki to Vonitsa is now expected to be completed by summer of 2023.

A6 (Attiki Odos)

Motorway 6, or Attiki Odos forms part of the urban motorway network of Athens's metropolitan area. The Attiki Odos has various auxiliary routes, namely the Aigaleo Beltway and the Hymettus Beltway, serving parts of western and eastern Athens respectively; while the 6 km (4 mi) section leading from the main route to the Athens International Airport is numbered as the A62.
 Motorway 62 is a section of the Attiki Odos which branches off at the end of the main A6 route. It basically serves as a corridor from Attiki Odos and Koropi towards the Athens International Airport.
 Motorway 64 is a section of the Attiki Odos which branches off the main A6 route. It is referred to as the Hymettus Beltway (A64) (Greek: Περιφερειακή Υμηττού), serving parts of eastern Athens, while it is also expected to be extended further southwards to Vouliagmeni and further eastwards towards Rafina.
 Motorway 65 is a second auxiliary route that branches off the main A6 route. The A64 section of the Attiki Odos is referred to as the Aigaleo Beltway (A65) (Greek: Περιφερειακή Αιγάλεω) and serves parts of western Athens. A small part of the A65 remains still unconstructed, and it is yet unknown when it will be completed.
 Motorway 642 is a small branch of Attiki Odos which connects Attiki Odos with Hymettus Beltway.

A7 (Moreas Motorway)

Motorway 7, known as the Moreas Motorway starts from Corinth, at the interchange with the A8 (Olympia Odos) and continues to Kalamata, passing through Tripoli. It replaced the old GR-7 as the main road, with the section between Corinth and Tripoli, constructed between 1984 and 1990 and officially becoming part of the Greek road network in 1992.

The A7 has recently undergone extensive improvement to full motorway standards. As of December 2012, the motorway section between Corinth and Kalamata is fully constructed and operational. Its total length is 205 kilometers or 127 miles.

 Motorway 71 is a branch of the A7 (Moreas) motorway from Lefktro, connecting it with Sparta. It was opened on 18 April 2016.

A8 (Olympia Odos)
Motorway 8, referred to as the Olympia Odos, is the motorway from Athens to Patras. It begins in Elefsina, at the interchange with A6 (Attiki Odos) and will end in Patras.

The Elefsina–Corinth section has been completed to motorway standards, while the Corinth – Patras section begun construction in 2008, and was due to be completed in 2012. After construction works had begun again the whole motorway was completed in 2017. It includes the widening and general reconstruction of the GR-8A along with some new tunnels and bridges.

The Patras - Pyrgos is currently under construction. The motorway will in future be extended to Tsakona (near Meligalas) where it will intersect with the A7 (Moreas Motorway). The full length of the motorway will be 373 km (231 miles) on completion.

A90 (Northern Crete motorway)
Motorway 90 is a temporary name for a motorway under construction in Crete. It is more widely known as North Road Axis of Crete (BOAK) and is Greece's only motorway that is not on its mainland, but on an island. Certain parts have already been completed, as of summer 2007, such as the bypasses at Heraklion, Rethymno and Chania. In late 2014, the Agios Nikolaos - Kalo Chorio part (which also serves as a bypass of Agios Nikolaos) was opened to traffic. Its full length will be 310 kilometres or 193 miles and it is expected to be completed by the year 2028.

Electronic toll system and interoperability 
On April 4, 2018, an international tender was launched by the Greek government for the Εxpression of Ιnterest for the procurement, design and installation of a satellite and electronic toll system (e-tolls) in the Greek motorways, using automatic number plate recognition (ANPR) and GNSS technologies. The new system would be the first distance-based pricing model in Greece, replacing the existing toll plazas and charging vehicles depending on the distance covered in the entirety of the country’s motorway network (including the currently state-owned Egnatia Motorway).The project's cost was estimated at about €400 million.

The system would be double; Passenger vehicles' license plates would automatically be captured and identified by traffic cameras upon their entrance and exit from the tolled motorway network with the use of ANPR technology, while professional and heavy vehicles would all carry transponders which would monitor and record their position using satellites (GNSS technology). 5 contenders participated in the tender, namely Aκtor SA – Intrakat – Intrasoft Int’l SA- Autostrade Tech S.p.A., Mytilineos – Nusz, Terna – Vinci – Kapsch TrafficCom, OTE – T-Systems International GmbH and STRABAG – SkyToll. In May 2019, the second phase of the tender was completed and two consortiums passed, Aκtor SA – Intrakat – Intrasoft Int’l SA- Autostrade Tech S.p.A. and Mytilineos – Nusz. Finally, a week before the legislative election of July 2019, the then Minister for Infrastructure, Transport and Networks Christos Spirtzis appointed concessionaire the consortium of Aκtor SA – Intrakat – Intrasoft Int’l SA- Autostrade Tech S.p.A., after evaluation of the financial offers.

Cancellation of the first tender 
Although the tender for the new system had been strongly disputed by the contestants themselves, the then Minister Ch. Spirtzis of Syriza decided to proceed with it. The concerns regarded the subject of the tender itself, as such a wide implementation does not exist in any developed country, as well as the absence of an agreement for the implementation of such a system. Moreover, existing concession agreements with the private companies managing most of the Greek motorways would have to be amended.

In the autumn of 2019, the tender for the electronic toll system was cancelled by the Council of State following the discovery of several deficiencies and an appeal by the Mytilineos – Nusz consortium, second bidder of the tender, and other participants regarding the bid evaluation procedure, noting that its bid was not preferred although it was lower by €70 million. The tender was officially cancelled at the end of May 2020.

Interoperability 
From March 2011, five (Attiki Odos SA, Aegean Motorway SA, Olympia Odos SA, Moreas SA, Gefyra SA) of the total of seven operating concessionaires of the Greek motorways are part of an interoperable network named "GRITS" (Greek Interoperable Toll Service), which allows drivers to travel along the participating motorways, passing from the electronic toll lanes, using a single transponder.

In October 2019, it was agreed that the remaining two concessionaires (Nea Odos SA and Kentriki Odos SA), as well as the currently state-owned Egnatia Odos SA, would join the GRITS network. Drivers will therefore be able to travel and pay tolls electronically using a single transponder across the entire Greek motorway network. In the autumn of 2019 technical discussions began between all the companies, testing of the system began in the summer of 2020 and it is expected to become operational in the autumn of 2020.

National Roads

The National Roads in Greece (Greek: Εθνικές Οδοί) are single carriageway or limited-access roads with one or two traffic lanes for each direction, usually with an emergency lane on each side as well.

 Additional National Roads according to the register of the National Roads 1998

Current construction projects in Greece 

As of autumn 2017, most motorway construction projects all over Greece are completed. 
 Part of the Central Greece Motorway was completed in late 2017 at a cost of 1,4 bn euros.
 Olympia Odos and Ionia Odos were both finished and opened to traffic in mid-2017 at a cost of 2,2 bn euros and 1,118 bn euros respectively.
 Moreas Motorway was completed in November 2016, costing a total of 1 bn euros.
 The final construction point of Motorway 1 at the Tempe Valley opened to traffic in April 2017, costing 1,3 bn euros.

Correlation with European routes 

This is a list of European routes that shows which parts of them run through Greece.

Major routes:

Other routes:

Note: When certain highways that carry European routes are replaced with motorways, the European routes will be reassigned to the new motorways. For example, GR-7 carried the E65 from Tripoli to Kalamata. When the Corinth – Tripoli – Kalamata motorway was completed, the E65 numbering was reassigned to it.

See also
 Transport in Greece
 Greece
 European routes
 List of countries by road network size
 List of roads and highways

References

External links 
 A greek motorways fan page
 A page about infrastracture in Greece

 
Highways
Roads